The Blockade of Germany, or the Blockade of Europe, occurred from 1914 to 1919. The prolonged naval blockade was conducted by the Allies during and after World War I in an effort to restrict the maritime supply of goods to the Central Powers, which included Germany, Austria-Hungary and the Ottoman Empire. The blockade is considered one of the key elements in the eventual Allied victory in the war. The German Board of Public Health in December 1918 claimed that 763,000 German civilians had already died from starvation and disease, caused by the blockade. An academic study done in 1928 put the death toll at 424,000. An additional 100,000 people may have died during the post-armistice continuation of the blockade in 1919.

Both Germany and the United Kingdom relied heavily on imports to feed their population and supply their war industry. Imports of foodstuffs and war materiel of European belligerents came primarily from the Americas and had to be shipped across the Atlantic Ocean, which made Britain and Germany aim to blockade each other. The British had the Royal Navy, which was superior in numbers and could operate throughout the British Empire, but the German Kaiserliche Marine surface fleet was mainly restricted to the German Bight, and it used commerce raiders and unrestricted submarine warfare elsewhere.

Background 
Prior to World War I, a series of conferences were held at Whitehall in 1905–1906 concerning military co-operation with France in the event of a war with Germany. The Director of Naval Intelligence, Charles Ottley, asserted that two of the Royal Navy's functions in such a war would be the capture of German commercial shipping and the blockade of German ports.  A blockade was considered useful for two reasons: it could force the enemy's fleet to fight, and it could act as an economic weapon to destroy German commerce. It was not until 1908, however, that a blockade of Germany formally appeared in the navy's war plans and even then some officials were divided over how feasible it was. The plans remained in a state of constant change and revision until 1914, with the navy undecided over how best to operate such a blockade.

Meanwhile, Germany had made no plans to manage its wartime food supplies since in peacetime, it produced about 80% of its total consumption. Furthermore, overland imports from the Netherlands, Scandinavia and Romania would be unaffected by any naval blockade. However, the combined issues of conscription of farm laborers, the requisition of horses, the poor weather and the diversion of nitrogen from fertilizer manufacture into military explosives all combined to cause a considerable drop in agricultural output.

Blockade
The British, with their overwhelming sea power, established a naval blockade of Germany immediately on the outbreak of war in August 1914, by issuing a comprehensive list of contraband that all but prohibited American trade with the Central Powers and in early November 1914 by declaring the North Sea to be a war zone, with any ships entering the North Sea doing so at their own risk. The blockade was unusually restrictive in that even foodstuffs were considered "contraband of war". There were complaints about breaches of international law, but most neutral merchant vessels agreed to dock at British ports to be inspected and then escorted, less any "illegal" cargo destined for Germany, through the British minefields to their destinations.

The Northern Patrol and the Dover Patrol closed off access to the North Sea and the English Channel, respectively.

The German government regarded the blockade as an attempt to starve the country into defeat and wanted to retaliate in kind. The German High Seas Fleet set out multiple times from 1914 to 1916 to reduce the British Grand Fleet and to regain access to vital imports. The sea conflicts culminated in the indecisive Battle of Jutland in 1916.

The blockade hurt American exports. Under pressure, especially from commercial interests wishing to profit from wartime trade with both sides, the American government protested vigorously. Britain did not wish to antagonise the Americans and set up a program to buy American cotton, guaranteed that the price stayed above peacetime levels and mollified cotton traders. When American ships were stopped with contraband, the British purchased the entire cargo and released the cargoless ship.

A memorandum to the British War Cabinet on 1 January 1917 stated that very few supplies were reaching Germany or its allies via the North Sea or other areas such as Austria-Hungary's Adriatic ports, which had been subject to a French blockade since 1914.

Effects on war 
The first English-language accounts of the effects of the blockade were by humanitarians, diplomats and medical professionals, who were sympathetic to the suffering of the German people. The official German account, based on data about disease, growth of children, and mortality, harshly criticised the Allies by calling the blockade a crime against innocent people. The first account commissioned by the Allies was written by Professor A. C. Bell and Brigadier-General Sir James E. Edmonds, hypothesised that the blockade led to revolutionary movements but concluded that based on the evidence, "it is more than doubtful whether this is the proper explanation". Germans wanted to end the war because of the food shortage, but workers staged a revolution because of the long-term theory of socialism. The revolutionaries claimed in their slogans, for example, that they were "Arbeitssklaven" (worker slaves) to the monarchy. Edmonds, on the other hand was supported by Colonel Irwin L. Hunt, who was in charge of civil affairs in the American occupied zone of the Rhineland, and held that food shortages were a post-armistice phenomenon caused solely by the disruptions of the German Revolution of 1918–19.

More recent studies also disagree on the severity of the blockade's impact on the affected populations at the time of the revolution and the armistice. Some hold that the blockade starved Germany and the Central Powers into defeat in 1918. Others hold that the armistice on 11 November was forced primarily by events on the Western Front, rather than any actions of the civilian population. The idea that a revolt of the home front forced the armistice was part of the stab-in-the-back myth. Also, Germany's largest ally, Austria-Hungary, had already signed an armistice on 3 November 1918, which exposed Germany to an invasion from the south. On 29 September 1918, General Erich Ludendorff told the Kaiser that the military front would soon collapse.

All scholars agree that the blockade made a large contribution to the outcome of the war. By 1915, Germany's imports had fallen by 55% from its prewar levels and the exports were 53% of what they had been in 1914. Apart from leading to shortages in vital raw materials such as coal and nonferrous metals, the blockade also deprived Germany of supplies of fertiliser that were vital to agriculture. That led to staples such as grain, potatoes, meat and dairy products becoming so scarce by the end of 1916 that many people were obliged to instead consume ersatz products, including Kriegsbrot ("war bread") and powdered milk. The food shortages caused looting and riots not only in Germany but also in Vienna and Budapest. The food shortages were so severe that by the autumn of 1918, Austria-Hungary hijacked barges on the Danube full of Rumanian wheat bound for Germany, which in turn threatened military retaliation. Also, during the winter of 1916 to 1917, there was a failure of the potato crop, which resulted in the urban population having to subsist largely on Swedish turnips. That period became known as the Steckrübenwinter or Turnip Winter.

The German government made strong attempts to counter the effects of the blockade. The Hindenburg Programme of German economic mobilisation was launched on 31 August 1916 and designed to raise productivity by the compulsory employment of all men between the ages of 17 and 60. A complicated rationing system, initially introduced in January 1915, aimed to ensure that a minimum nutritional need was met, with "war kitchens" providing cheap mass meals to impoverished civilians in larger cities. All of those schemes enjoyed only limited success, and the average daily diet of 1,000 calories was insufficient to maintain a good standard of health, which resulted by 1917 in widespread disorders caused by malnutrition such as scurvy, tuberculosis and dysentery.

The official German statistics estimated 763,000 civilian malnutrition and disease deaths were caused by the blockade of Germany. That figure was disputed by a subsequent academic study, which put the death toll at 424,000. The German official statistics came from a German government report published in December 1918 that estimated the blockade to be responsible for the deaths of 762,796 civilians, and the report claimed that that figure did not include deaths caused by the Spanish flu epidemic in 1918. The figures for the last six months of 1918 were estimated. Maurice Parmelle maintained that "it is very far from accurate to attribute to the blockade all of the excess deaths above pre-war mortality" and believed that the German figures were "somewhat exaggerated". The German claims were made while Germany was waging a propaganda campaign to end the Allied blockade of Germany after the armistice that lasted from November 1918 to June 1919. Also in 1919, Germany raised the issue of the Allied blockade to counter charges against the German use of submarine warfare.

In 1928, a German academic study, sponsored by the Carnegie Endowment for International Peace provided a thorough analysis of the German civilian deaths during the war. The study estimated 424,000 war-related deaths of civilians over the age of one in Germany, not including Alsace-Lorraine, and the authors attributed the civilian deaths over the prewar level primarily to food and fuel shortages in 1917–1918. The study also estimated an additional 209,000 Spanish flu deaths in 1918. A study sponsored by the Carnegie Endowment for International Peace in 1940 estimated the German civilian death toll at over 600,000. Based on the 1928 German study, it maintained, "A thorough inquiry has led to the conclusion that the number of 'civilian' deaths traceable to the war was 424,000, to which number must be added about 200,000 deaths caused by the influenza epidemic". The historian and demographer Jay Winter estimated that there were 300,000 excess deaths in Germany from the blockade, after subtracting deaths from the influenza epidemic.

After armistice
In March 1919, Winston Churchill told the British House of Commons: "We are holding all our means of coercion in full operation, or in immediate readiness for use. We are enforcing the blockade with vigour. We have strong armies ready to advance at the shortest notice. Germany is very near starvation. The evidence I have received from the officers sent by the War Office all over Germany shows, first of all, the great privations which the German people are suffering, and, secondly, the great danger of a collapse of the entire structure of German social and national life under the pressure of hunger and malnutrition. Now is therefore the moment to settle".

The blockade was maintained for eight months after the November 1918 armistice. According to the New Cambridge Modern History, food imports into Germany were controlled by the Allies after the armistice until Germany signed the Treaty of Versailles in June 1919. From January 1919 to March 1919, Germany refused to agree to the demand by the Allies to surrender its merchant ships to Allied ports to transport food supplies. Germans considered the armistice a temporary cessation of the war and feared that if fighting broke out again, the ships would be confiscated outright. In January, hoping to buy time, the German government notified an American representative in Berlin that the shortage of food would not become critical until late spring. Facing food riots at home, Germany finally agreed to surrender its fleet on 14 March 1919. The Allies allowed Germany, under their supervision, to import 300,000 tons of grain and 70,000 tons of cured pork per month until August 1919. In April, the food from America arrived in Germany. The restrictions on food imports were finally lifted on 12 July 1919 after Germany had signed the Treaty of Versailles.

C. Paul Vincent maintains that for the German people, they were the most devastating months of the blockade because "in the weeks and months following the armistice, Germany's deplorable state further deteriorated."<ref>C. Paul Vincent, The Politics of hunger: The Allied Blockade of Germany, 1915–1919, Athens, Ohio: Ohio University Press, c1985ISBN 978-0-8214-0831-5, p. 145</ref> Sally Marks argues that the German accounts of a hunger blockade are a "myth" since Germany did not face the starvation level of Belgium and the regions of Poland and of northern France that it had occupied. At the armistice discussions in January 1919, the Allies offered to let Germany import food if it agreed to turn over its merchant fleet, but Germany refused until the last armistice discussions in March. The head of the German armistice delegation, Matthias Erzberger, balked at first at giving up the merchant fleet. He feared that if Germany surrendered it, the Allies would confiscate it as reparations. Before he surrendered the fleet, he wanted guarantees that the food imports could be financed with foreign credit owed to German businesses. Leaders in industry and government feared that by taking the fleet, the Allies aimed to sever Germany from world markets. The Allies would gain an unfair competitive edge over the German steel industries, which depended on import of ore and sale to countries abroad, by charging high prices for ocean transport. In the German Republic's official mouthpiece, the Deputy State Secretary of the German Food Office, Braun made known his fear that if the Allies took the ships, the dockworkers in the ports would revolt and rekindle the Spartacist uprising, which aimed to overthrow the republic. The leaders of the German republic had to weigh those considerations against the reality that in early 1919, rations in German cities were on average 1,500 calories per day.

Not included in the German government's December 1918 figure of 763,000 deaths were civilian deaths related to the famine in 1919. A recent academic study maintains that no statistical data exist for the death toll of the period immediately after the November 1918 armistice. Dr. Max Rubner in an April 1919 article claimed that 100,000 German civilians had died from the continuation of the blockade of Germany after the armistice. The British Labour Party antiwar activist Robert Smillie issued a statement in June 1919 condemning continuation of the blockade and claiming that 100,000 German civilians had died.

Impact on children
The impact on childhood was assessed by Mary E. Cox by using newly discovered data, based on heights and weights of nearly 600,000 German schoolchildren, who were measured between 1914 and 1924. The data indicate that children suffered severe malnutrition. Class was a major factor, as the working-class children suffered the most but were the quickest to recover after the war. Recovery to normality was made possible by massive food aid organized by the United States and other former enemies."Hunger in War and Peace: Women and Children in Germany 1914-1924" Cox, Mary E. 2019. Oxford: Oxford University Press. 

See also
 Great Famine of Mount Lebanon
 Dover Patrol
 Economic warfare
 North Sea Mine Barrage
 Northern Patrol
 U-boat Campaign (World War I)

Notes

References
 

Further reading
 Bell, A.C. A history of the blockade of Germany and of the countries associated with her in the Great War, Austria-Hungary, Bulgaria, and Turkey, 1914-1918 (London:  HM Stationery Office, 1937). online
 Davis, Belinda. Food Politics, and Everyday Life in World War I Berlin: Home Fires Burning (U of North Carolina Press, 2000) online
 Howard, N. P. "The social and political consequences of the allied food blockade of Germany, 1918-19." German History 11.2 (1993): 161–88. online
 Hull, Isabel V. A scrap of paper: breaking and making international law during the Great War (Cornell UP, 2014).
 
 Kennedy, Greg. "Intelligence and the Blockade, 1914–17: A Study in Administration, Friction and Command." Intelligence and National security 22.5 (2007): 699–721.
 Link, Arthur S. Wilson: the struggle for Neutrality 1914-1915 (1960), passim the legal and diplomatic aspects of blockade from American perspective
 McDermott, John. "Total War and the Merchant State: Aspects of British Economic Warfare against Germany, 1914-16." Canadian Journal of History 21.1 (1986): 61–76.
 McKercher, B. J. C., and Keith E. Neilson. "‘The triumph of unarmed forces’: Sweden and the allied blockade of Germany, 1914–1917." Journal of Strategic Studies 7.2 (1984): 178-199.
 Mulder, Nicholas. The Economic Weapon: The Rise of Sanctions as a Tool of Modern War (2022) ch 1-2; excerpt also see online review

 
 Siney, Marion C. The allied blockade of Germany, 1914-1916 (U of Michigan Press, 1957).
 Vincent, C. Paul. The Politics of Hunger: The Allied Blockade of Germany, 1915-1919 (Ohio UP, 1985).
 Woodward, Llewellyn. Great Britain and the War of 1914-1918'' (1967) pp 186-205;  legal and diplomatic aspects of blockade from British perspective

Primary sources
 United Kingdom National Archives, "Memorandum to the War Cabinet on Trade Blockade ." Note 2. Online 21.) Ibid., Note 2.

Germany
German Empire in World War I
Economic history of World War I
Home front during World War I
Malnutrition
Germany
Naval battles of World War I involving Germany
Germany
Germany
1914 in Germany
1915 in Germany
1916 in Germany
1917 in Germany
1918 in Germany
1919 in Germany
World War I